Ernest Davis Brown (born March 14, 1971) is a former American football defensive end who played two seasons with the Pittsburgh Steelers. He played college football at Syracuse University.

References

1971 births
Living people
American football defensive ends
Syracuse Orange football players
Pittsburgh Steelers players
Players of American football from Pittsburgh